No Moccasin Creek is a stream in the U.S. state of South Dakota.

No Moccasin Creek has the name of Chief No Moccasin, a Brulé Indian who settled there.

See also
List of rivers of South Dakota

References

Rivers of Tripp County, South Dakota
Rivers of South Dakota